Several COVID-19 commissions have been proposed to examine national responses to the COVID-19 pandemic.

Denmark

Norway  

The Norwegian government appointed a commission on 24 April 2020, which submitted its report to on 14 April 2021.

USA

UK 

According to the Guardian, a group of bereaved families called for a "judge-led" public inquiry into the British government response to the COVID-19 pandemic. The Guardian reported that other forms of public inquiry, such as a royal commission, are available should the government "defy rising pressure for a statutory public inquiry". 

In May 2021, the UK government announced a public inquiry will begin in Spring of 2022 called the UK Covid-19 Inquiry, and the Scottish Government established the Scottish Covid-19 Inquiry. The Independent reported that the date of the inquiry may be pushed beyond the promised date.

Sweden  

A government-appointed commission in Sweden published its report in October 2021.

See also  
 National responses to the COVID-19 pandemic

References  
 

Public inquiries
Impact of the COVID-19 pandemic on politics